Dihydrexidine (DAR-0100) is a moderately selective full agonist at the dopamine D1 and D5 receptors.  It has approximately 10-fold selectivity for D1 and D5 over the D2 receptor.  Although dihydrexidine has some affinity for the D2 receptor, it has functionally selective (highly biased) D2 signaling, thereby explaining why it lacks D2 agonist behavioral qualities.

Dihydrexidine has shown impressive antiparkinson effects in the MPTP-primate model, and has been investigated for the treatment of Parkinson's disease. In an early clinical trial the drug was given intravenously and led to profound hypotension so development was halted.  The drug was resurrected when it was shown that smaller subcutaneous doses were safe.  This led to a pilot study in schizophrenia and current clinical trials to assess its efficacy in improving the cognitive and working memory deficits in schizophrenia and schizotypal disorder.

There have been several reviews of relevance to the compound.

References 

D1-receptor agonists
D2-receptor agonists
D5 receptor agonists
Catechols
Biased ligands